Anchor Bay may refer to:

 Anchor Bay, California
 Anchor Bay, Michigan
 Anchor Bay Entertainment, a home video company
 Anchor Bay High School, a school in Fair Haven, Michigan
 The location of Popeye Village, in Malta